Forgotten Realms: Unlimited Adventures, also known as Unlimited Adventures, or by the acronyms FRUA or UA, is a video game originally released on March 17, 1993, by Strategic Simulations, for the IBM PC and Macintosh.

Gameplay
Unlimited Adventures is a construction kit for computer role-playing games, and drew its content from the prior Gold Box engine games, with improved graphics. SSI's contract with TSR, Inc. required the former to stop using the Gold Box engine, so the company released its development tools. Games created by users can be shared with other players who also own Unlimited Adventures. As of 2022, the program still has an active community of users.

The original game allowed the user to create dungeon modules, some editing and renaming of monsters and characters, and to import pictures and monster sprites. However, some art, such as walls, combat backdrops, and title screens, could not be changed in the unmodified game.

Those limitations have been overcome by community-made mods.  The availability of these mods has led to the creation of comprehensive "worldhacks", designed to allow the creation of science fiction, superhero, Western and Roman Empire adventures, among others.  A program called "UASHELL" applies and manages these hacks and enables the player to apply them.  

The fanmade game design program Dungeon Craft (originally called UA Forever) is a standalone program that partially emulates FRUA'''s engine, but with a greater ease of user modification.

CompilationsForgotten Realms Unlimited Adventures is included in the compilation "The Forgotten Realm Archives - Collection Two".

Reception

SSI sold 32,364 copies of Unlimited Adventures. Computer Gaming World in 1993 called it "the best adventure-construction kit available" despite the "sorely lacking" Gold Box engine. According to GameSpy in 2004, although "the game's graphics were poor [...] and using the tools could be a little complicated, Unlimited Adventures'' was an excellent tool for budding RPG designers".

References

External links

The Magic Mirror: The largest FRUA resource online
Dungeon Craft at Sourceforge
Dungeon Craft at The Ironworks

1993 video games
Classic Mac OS games
DOS games
Forgotten Realms video games
Gold Box
Role-playing video games
Strategic Simulations games
Tactical role-playing video games
Video game development software
Video games developed in the United States
Video games featuring protagonists of selectable gender
Video games scored by George Sanger
Video games with oblique graphics
Video games with user-generated gameplay content